Rage may refer to:
 Rage (emotion), an intense form of anger

Games
 Rage (collectible card game), a collectible card game
 Rage (trick-taking card game), a commercial variant of the card game Oh Hell
 Rage (video game), a 2011 first-person shooter and racing video game 
 Rage 2, a 2019 open world first-person shooter and racing video game and a sequel to the first game
 Rage Games, a defunct game developer
 Rockstar Advanced Game Engine, a game engine developed by Rockstar San Diego
 Rage quitting, when players quit a video game for reasons often related to frustration
 R.A.G.E., the engine used to make Combat Assault Vehicle

Film and television
 Rage (1966 film), starring Glenn Ford and directed by Gilberto Gazcón
 Rage (1972 film), directed by and starring George C. Scott
 Rage!, 1980 made-for-television film directed by William A. Graham and starring David Soul and James Whitmore
 Rage, 1995 action film directed by Joseph Merhi and starring Gary Daniels
 Rage (1997 film), Yugoslav film
 The Rage (1997 film), starring Kristen Cloke and Lorenzo Lamas
 Rage (1999 film), drama written and directed by Newton Aduaka
 The Rage: Carrie 2, 1999 horror film that was the sequel to Carrie
 The Rage (2002 film), Romanian film directed by Radu Muntean
 Rage (2006 film), German film
 The Rage (2007 film), horror film
 The Rage (2008 film), Italian drama film
 Rage (2009 American film), mystery film written starring Jude Law and Judi Dench
 Rage (2009 Spanish film)
 Rage (2014 film), thriller film starring Nicolas Cage
 Rage (2016 film), film by Lee Sang-il
 "Rage" (Law & Order: Special Victims Unit), an episode of Law & Order: Special Victims Unit
 Rage (Queer as Folk), fictional superhero comic book in Queer as Folk
 Rage (TV program), an Australian music video program
 "Rage," an episode of the cartoon Extreme Ghostbusters
 Rage, a fictional genetically-engineered virus in the film 28 Days Later

Literature
 Rage (Kessler novel), a 2011 young adult novel by Jackie Morse Kessler
 Rage (King novel), a 1977 novel by Stephen King
 Rage (Smith novel), a 1987 novel by Wilbur Smith
 Rage (Woodward book), a 2020 non-fiction book by Bob Woodward about Donald Trump presidency
 Rage, a 2005 mystery novel by Jonathan Kellerman

Music

Albums and songs
 Rage (Attila album), 2010
 Rage (T'Pau album), 1988
 The Rage: Original Motion Picture Soundtrack, 2007 by Midnight Syndicate
 "Rage", a song by Sander Van Doorn, Firebeatz and Julian Jordan (DJ)
 "The Rage", a song by Judas Priest from their 1980 album British Steel
 "The Rage", a song by Kid Cudi from the soundtrack for the 2018 film, Rampage

Bands
 Rage (English group), an English dance group
 Rage (German band), a German heavy metal band
 Rage, a shorthand form of the American rap rock band Rage Against the Machine

People
 Rage (director), artistic name for American music video director Dale Resteghini
 Al Green (wrestler), stage name Rage, former American professional wrestler Alfred Dobalo (1955–2013)
 Kyle Gass of Tenacious D (born 1960), sometimes known as Rage or Rage-Kage
 The Lady of Rage (born 1968), American rapper
 Rage, guitarist with Venom, real name John Stuart Dixon

Fictional characters
 Rage (comics), a fictional character from Marvel Comics
 Ezekiel Rage, a character from The Real Adventures of Jonny Quest
 Rage (Transformers), a fictional Transformers character
 The Rage, one of the main antagonists of the Red Dwarf novel Last Human by Doug Naylor
 Michael "Rage" Jarman, a supporting character of the Zom-B novel series by Darren Shan

Other uses
 RAGE (gene), a gene that in humans encodes the enzyme MAPK/MAK/MRK overlapping kinase
 RAGE (receptor), the biological receptor for advanced glycation endproducts
 Rage (roller coaster), a beyond-vertical-drop roller coaster at Adventure Island
 The Rage (Canada's Wonderland), a swinging ship ride at Canada's Wonderland
 ATI Rage, a series of graphics chipsets by ATI
 Rage comic, also known as FFFFFUUUU-, an Internet meme

See also
 Air rage
 Road rage